This list details Australian people working in the film industry who have been nominated for, or won, Academy Awards (also known as Oscars). These awards honour outstanding achievements in theatrically released motion pictures and were first presented by the United States Academy of Motion Picture Arts and Sciences (AMPAS) in 1929. , a total of 55 awards from 192 nominations have been won by Australians. Additionally, awards for Scientific and Engineering achievements have been given to Australians four times.

Art director and costume designer Catherine Martin has received more awards than any other Australian, with four wins from nine nominations. She was nominated for Best Picture, Best Costume Design, and Best Production Design, winning the latter two categories. Cate Blanchett is the most nominated individual on this list with eight nominations, which resulted in wins for Best Actress and Best Supporting Actress. Peter Weir has received five competitive nominations in the Best Picture, Best Director and Best Original Screenplay categories without a win; however, he was awarded the Academy Honorary Award in 2022.

May Robson was the first Australian-born person to receive an Oscar nomination for Best Actress in 1933 for Lady for a Day. In 1942, Ken G. Hall became the first Australian to win an Academy Award for his documentary Kokoda Front Line! in the Best Documentary category. Suzanne Baker was the first Australian woman to win an Oscar, which was given to her in 1977 for Best Animated Short for Leisure. Peter Finch was the first Australian to win an acting Oscar and the first performer ever to be awarded posthumously, winning for Best Actor for his performance in Network in 1976. Fellow Australian, Heath Ledger, became only the second posthumous acting winner when his performance in The Dark Knight earned him Best Supporting Actor in 2008, about  32 years later. Cate Blanchett was the first Australian actor to win more than one award in the acting categories. Out of the six total Australian performers who have won acting Oscars, only Blanchett, Ledger and Geoffrey Rush were born in Australia; with Finch, Nicole Kidman and Russell Crowe being born outside of Australia, in England, the United States and New Zealand, respectively, and raised in Australia.

Australians have been nominated at least once in all categories. The Oscar for Best Costume Design has been the most successful category for Australians with seven wins from 17 nominations. The Academy Awards for Best Foreign Language Film, Best Original Score, and the Best Documentary (Short Subject) are the only categories in this list where Australians have been nominated without winning.

Nominees and winners
In the following tables, the years correspond to the year in which the films were released; the Academy Award ceremony is held the following year.

Production

Best Picture

Best Foreign Language Film

Best Documentary Feature

Best Documentary (Short Subject)

Best Animated Film

Best Animated Short Film

Best Live Action Short Film

Performance

Best Actress

Best Supporting Actress

Best Actor

Best Supporting Actor

Craft

Best Cinematography

Best Costume Design

Best Director

Best Editing

Best Makeup and Hairstyling

Best Music, Original Score

Best Music, Original Song

Best Production Design
Note: Before 2012, the category was called Best Art Direction-Set Decoration.

Best Sound Mixing

Best Sound Editing

Best Visual Effects

Best Adapted Screenplay

Best Original Screenplay

Non-competitive awards

Academy Honorary Award

Scientific and Engineering

See also

 Cinema of Australia
 List of Australian submissions for the Academy Award for Best Foreign Language Film

References

External links
The official website of the Academy of Motion Picture Arts and Sciences (AMPAS)

Further reading
Academy Awards® Nominations and Awards for Australian projects and people at Screen Australia
O stands for Oscar and also for Oz at The Age

Lists of Academy Award winners and nominees by nationality or region
Academy Awards
Australian film-related lists